Norihiko Miyazaki (born September 1, 1969 in Saijō, Ehime) is a former volleyball player from Japan, who played as a wing-spiker for the Men's National Team during the 1990s. He attained 10th place at the 1998 World Championship.

Honours

1998 World Championship — 16th place

References
 Profile

1969 births
Living people
People from Saijō, Ehime
Sportspeople from Ehime Prefecture
Japanese men's volleyball players
Asian Games medalists in volleyball
Volleyball players at the 1994 Asian Games
Medalists at the 1994 Asian Games
Asian Games gold medalists for Japan